51st parallel may refer to:

51st parallel north, a circle of latitude in the Northern Hemisphere
51st parallel south, a circle of latitude in the Southern Hemisphere